Interak is a range of Z80 based CP/M computers from Greenbank Electronics a small UK producer of Z80-based computers in the early 1980s based in Liverpool.

The system was a rack back system that allowed the purchase of individual boards to expand the system. The bus is of Interak's own design.

References

Computer-related introductions in 1982
Z80-based home computers
Personal computers
Computers designed in the United Kingdom